The Butler Arms Hotel is located in the town of Waterville in Kerry County, Ireland. It is best known for its rare selection of guests such as Charlie Chaplin, Walt Disney, Michael Douglas, Catherine Zeta-Jones and Michael Flatley. The hotel has a written history closely linked with the history of Ireland that extends back to 1884.

In 1884 in the village of Waterville the Commercial Cable Company established a transatlantic cable station, while the Direct United States line had already established at Ballinskelligs. However, the first cable had been laid into Valentia Island a quarter of a century before.

Overview

Golf and Angling
J B Hayens, Leamington, arrived on 20 March 1884. Spent eight weeks in the Butler Arms and found everything as comfortable as any angler could wish for. Sport on the lake very good. Caught salmon of an average weight of 13 lbs.

T. C. Kingsmill Moore, who later became Justice of the Supreme Court stayed in the hotel in 1932 to fish on the lake and feature his experience in his acclaimed angling book,  A Man May Fish.

In previous times the course designer, Lionel Hewson, came to the Butler Arms for golf and peace. While he was laying out Tralee Golf Course at Oakpark he was unsettled by men watching him from the fence.

Historic guests

Beside Hewson's name on his first visit to the Butler Arms in 1916 is that of Captain Richard Aramberg Blennerhassett Chute and Mrs Chaloner Chute of Chute Hall and Blennerville in Tralee. And Mrs. Chaloner Chute and her children, Desmond and Chaloner, returned to the hotel without the captain the following year. 

Sir Horace Plunkett came to the hotel twice in 1891, immediately after his appointment to the newly formed Congested Districts Board. From there he saw the conditions of the people and formulated his vision of setting up the cooperative societies and creameries of Ireland.

In August 1899 the hotel register was graced with the name of Roland Allanson Winn. He was an engineer who had built roads in India and designed coastal defences at Bray in Wicklow and Youghal in Cork along with coast protection in his home territory of Glenbeigh. 

The following year, as a new century began and a new Land Act was widely anticipated, James Burns Hartopp of Scraftoft Hall in Leicestershire came to the hotel. 

Lord Dunraven, who chaired the Land Conference of 1902, was a frequent visitor to the hotel.

Women of great influence and wealth
Women of great influence and wealth also came to the Butler Arms, amongst them, in 1937, the Countess of Lauderdale of Thirlstane Castle in Berwickshire, then one of the grandest private residences in Scotland. 

Lady Maud Petty-Fitzmaurice, Marchioness of Lansdowne of Bowood House in Wiltshire also spent time at the hotel in 1903. As the daughter of the first Duke of Abercorn and Lady of the Bedchamber to Queen Alexandra of Denmark, she held extensive influence in her own right, while her husband, the fifth Marquess of Lansdowne held numerous posts including Viceroy of India and Governor General of Canada.

The scenery
Lady Maud Landsdowne or The Countess of Lauderdale, like many others, didn't come to the hotel for golf or fishing but rather to relax in its comforts and enjoy the scenery as described in Lord Thomas Babington Macaulay's The History of England from the Accession of James the Second 

The south western part of Kerry is now well known as the most beautiful tract in the British Isles. The mountains, the glens, the islands, the capes stretching far into the Atlantic, the crags on which the eagles build, the rivulets brawling down rocky passes, the lakes overhung by groves in which the wild deer find covert, attract every summer, crowds of wanderers sated with the business and pleasures of great cities.

The beauties of that country are indeed too often hidden in the mist and rain which the west wind brings up from a boundless ocean. But on the rare days when the sun shines out in all his glory, the landscape has a freshness and warmth of coloring seldom found in our latitude. The myrtle loves the soil. The arbutus thrives better than on the sunny shores of Calabria. The turf is of livelier hue than elsewhere. the hills glow with richer purple, the varnish on the holly and ivy is more glossy; and berries of a brighter red peep through foliage of a brighter green..

, .

The Railway leads to Expansion of Tourism
Bradshaw's Railway Guides would also promote the scenery and fishing but not in such unique words as Lord Macaulay's and the coming of the railway to Killarney in 1853 was of great benefit to the Butler Arms Hotel and to Kerry in general.

When the Butler Arms opened in 1884 it not only benefited from the cable companies but nine years later the railway was extended to Cahersiveen and Renard Point opposite Valentia Island. The Huggard family, who had bought the hotel from the McElligotts soon spread their wings along the railway lines and came to own the Royal Hotel in Valentia, The Caragh Lake Hotel and the Lake Hotel in Killarney, the last of which is still in their possession.

Writers and Film Stars
In the 1960s business was at a peak and Charlie Chaplin and his family were almost turned away; but the owner stepped forward and gave them his private suite. It was the beginning of a great relationship, as they returned for long holidays several times after that. Walt Disney and his wife and daughters had stayed there in 1947 and with them was Dr James Delargy, the man who had set up the Irish Folklore Commission. Song of the South, from the Uncle Remus stories of Joel Chandler Harris of Georgia (1946) was a box office success at the time Disney met Dr. Delargy and Dr. Delargy had taken down more folklore from Sean O Connell in Ballinskelligs, across the bay from the hotel, than had ever been collected from one source at any time.

Famous writers such as Alfred Perceval Graves, Virginia Woolf and John Steinbeck also stayed in the Butler Arms but Chaplin is remembered best of all. A statue of him stands, life size on the street, and a festival runs for his honor. But a young Miss Blake who holidayed in the hotel with her parents and throughout her married lifetime  remembered a moonlit night in 1932 when John McCormack sang his best from the steps of the hotel stairs.

The Butler Arms register
The hotel register wasn't preserved so well from the end of the 1950s and it hasn't been relied on for the article. But its quality and neatness until then allows for a unique summary regarding those who once graced the hotel carpets. The very first guest in the Butler Arms left an account of what he hoped for and what he found in the hotel and in Lough Currane. But his address, Leamington, is so broad that it allows no enquiry into his own story. Hundreds of entries in the register have similarly broad addresses.

The finding of such precise addresses as Scraftoft Hall or Thirlestane Castle has been great, and only equaled by finding the inclusion of double barrel and treble barrel Christian names that link the guests unmistakably with their positions and stories.

See also
List of hotels

References

Further reading
(27 October 2007.) "Leader of men who went his own way." Independent.ie News. Accessed November 2011.
Irish Times: 10 August 1896, 25 May 1914,14 July 1960, 28 March 1961, 21 March 1984, 25 August 2011.
Chaplin, Michael (1966). I Couldn't Smoke the Grass on My Father's Lawn. Ballantine Books.
Bell, Anne Olivier;  McNeillie, Andrew (1983). The Diaries of Virginia Woolf 1931-1935

External links

A 1943 Life magazine photograph of the hotel

Hotels in County Kerry
Hotels established in 1884
Buildings and structures in County Kerry